The 2015 Mountain West Conference men's basketball tournament was a tournament played March 11–14 at the Thomas & Mack Center in Las Vegas, Nevada.

Seeds
Teams were seeded by conference record, with a ties broken by record between the tied teams followed by record against the regular-season champion, if necessary. The top six seeds received first round byes.

Schedule

Bracket

* denotes an overtime period

References

External links
2015 Mountain West Championship

Mountain West Conference men's basketball tournament
Tournament
Mountain West Conference men's basketball tournament
Mountain West Conference men's basketball tournament